The C207/A207 Mercedes-Benz E-Class are coupé and convertible models based on the W204 C-Class sedan chassis. It was produced between 2009 and 2017 as the successor to the previous C209/A209 CLK-Class. The body styles of the range are:

 2-door coupé (C207)
 2-door convertible (A207)

Unlike its predecessor, the coupé and cabriolet models were never offered in the high performance Mercedes-AMG versions. E350 and E400 coupé models were also available in all-wheel drive 4MATIC variants from 2012.

It was replaced by the C238/A238 E-Class in 2017 for model year 2018.

Development and launch 
The C207/A207 E-Class shares its platform with the W204 C-Class sedan, featuring identical wheelbases, and similar axle track lengths. While the W212 E-Class sedan is built at the Sindelfingen plant, the E-Class C207 coupé is built in Bremen alongside the W204 C-Class.

Initial petrol models used the CGI BlueEFFICIENCY name, with the exception of the E 300 BlueEFFICIENCY and E 500. With the introduction of the Mercedes 7G-Tronic automatic transmission in 2011, models subsequently dropped the CGI moniker, along with the BlueEFFICIENCY name after the 2013 facelift. Diesel models with the nine-speed automatic transmission were also called BlueTEC instead of CDI BlueEFFICIENCY, and facelifted models were simply called CDI or BlueTEC.

Mercedes-Benz originally intended for the C207/A207 to be called CLK, but moved over to the E-Class name later during development.

Body styles

Coupé (C207) 
The coupé was introduced at the 2009 Geneva Motor Show.

Convertible (A207) 
The convertible was unveiled at the 2010 North American International Auto Show.

Convertible models are available with Mercedes' AIRSCARF system, which provides neck-level heating for front occupants, and the AIRCAP windshield spoiler and wind deflector system, deflecting air over the cabin for reduced draft and wind noise.

Equipment 

Standard equipment includes Mercedes' AGILITY CONTROL semi-adaptive suspension and ATTENTION ASSIST which alerts the driver when the car detects driver fatigue. Models feature front, side, and knee airbags, along with belt tensioners and head restraints. An AMG Sports package can also be optioned, featuring AMG bodystyling,  lower suspension, silver painted front brake calipers, and wider 18-inch alloy wheels.

Models

Petrol engines

Diesel engines

2013 facelift 

The mid-life cycle update for the C207/A207 E-Class was introduced at the North American International Auto Show in 2013:

 Exterior changes include: redesigned LED headlights and taillights, and revised front and rear bumpers
 Interior changes include: restyled instrument cluster and center console switch layout, redesigned steering wheel, and gear selector location moved to steering wheel column
 Introduction of E 400 model, and updated engines in E 200 and E 250 models
 Mercedes COLLISION PREVENTION ASSIST, ATTENTION ASSIST, and stop-start engine system now standard on models
 9G-Tronic automatic transmission introduced on diesel models

Awards 
 2009 Auto Bild Design Award: Germany's most beautiful coupé
 2010 Auto motor und sport "Autonis Design Award" for the convertible

References 

C207
C207
Cars introduced in 2009
2010s cars